In Uganda, students receive the Uganda Certificate of Education (UCE) when they finish the four year lower secondary school. It is comparable to GCE O-Level in the UK. UCE is also called "O-Level" by the people in Uganda. The UCE examinations are administered by the Uganda National Examinations Board (UNEB).

External links
 UNEB Homepage

See also
Education in Uganda
Uganda Advanced Certificate of Education

References

School qualifications
Education in Uganda